Kunka (Aymara and Quechua for throat, gullet, neck, voice, Hispanicized spelling Cunca) is a mountain in the La Raya mountain range in the Andes of Peru. It is situated at the La Raya Pass and the road and rail which connect Cusco with Lake Titicaca. Kunka lies southwest of the mountains Yana Khuchilla and Chimpulla. Other neighboring mountains are Huch'uy K'uchu north of it and Hatun Ichhuna Kunka in the south. Between the road and the mountain there is a little lake named Q'umirqucha (Quechua q'umir green, qucha lake, "green lake", Comercocha).

North of Kunka there is a stream called Hatun K'uchu (Quechua for "big corner", Hispanicized Atuncucho). It is an affluent of the Willkanuta River which originates near the pass.

Images

References 

Mountains of Peru
Mountains of Cusco Region
Mountains of Puno Region